Matías Rojas Coloma (born 29 October 1996) is a Chilean footballer who plays as a defender.

Career
Cobresal became Rojas' opening senior club in 2015. After going as an unused substitute on four occasions during 2015–16, Rojas was eventually given his professional debut by manager Rubén Vallejos in a fixture versus Unión La Calera on 24 October 2015. Cobresal were relegated to Primera B de Chile at the conclusion of 2016–17, Rojas had made twenty-five top-flight appearances prior. He stayed with the club for one and a half seasons, which preceded a departure in July 2018 to Provincial Ovalle of the Chilean Tercera División. A move to General Velásquez followed in 2019.

Career statistics
.

References

External links

1996 births
Living people
People from Santiago Province, Chile
Chilean footballers
Association football defenders
Chilean Primera División players
Primera B de Chile players
Segunda División Profesional de Chile players
Cobresal footballers
General Velásquez footballers